Willamette Pass Resort is a ski area in the western United States, located at Willamette Pass in west central Oregon, in Klamath and Lane counties. In the Cascade Range between Oakridge and La Pine and accessed by Highway 58, it operates on federal land under special use permit on the Willamette and Deschutes National Forests. Founded in 1941, the ski area has been locally-owned and operated by the Wiper family of Eugene since 1982, the year its first chairlift was installed.

Ski area information
Willamette Pass Resort is not a year-round destination : Summer operations have been suspended for several years now, but the local biking clubs and disc golf clubs are ready to help support relaunching them when the owner chooses to open summer operations again. 

Willamette Pass is best known for having one of the steepest runs in the world, "RTS", which at its steepest point is 52 degrees. It hosted the 1993 Subaru U.S. Speed Skiing Championships, where a top speed of 111.56 mph (179.54 km/h) was achieved.

The area is a popular place for nearby schools to visit, with lessons and plenty of green runs. The lodge has a restaurant, shop, lost-and-found service, and ski and snowboard rentals.

Snowshoeing and Nordic skiing activities are also available.

The resort has recently partnered with ( or been acquired by ) Mountain Capital Partners or MCP for short.

Resort statistics

Elevation
Summit: 
Base: 
Vertical:

Trails
Skiable area: 
Groomable area: 
Trails: 29 total - 20% Beginner - 45% Intermediate - 35% Advanced / Expert
 Nordic trails: up to  groomed
Longest run: "Kaleidoscope/Perseverance" - 2.1 mi (3 km)
Steepest run: "RTS"- up to 52°
Average annual snowfall:  
Peaks: 2
Eagle Peak
Peak 2

Lifts

5 Total
1 High-Speed Six Pack Eagle Peak Accelerator (Doppelmayr CTEC)
3 Triple Chairs Sleepy Hollow, Twilight Lift and Peak 2 Lift (Riblet Tramway Company)
1 Magic Carpet
Lift capacity: 9,300 skiers per hour

U.S. Ski Team
 Mike Lafferty - 1972 Olympian

References

External links
 
 Ski Lifts.org Photos of Willamette Pass Lifts

Ski areas and resorts in Oregon
Buildings and structures in Klamath County, Oregon
Tourist attractions in Klamath County, Oregon
1941 establishments in Oregon